Sucker Punch is a 2011 American psychological fantasy action film directed by Zack Snyder and co-written by Snyder and Steve Shibuya. It is Snyder's first film based on an original concept. The film stars Emily Browning as "Babydoll", a young woman who is committed to a mental institution. As she collects items she needs to escape, she enters a series of fantasy worlds where she and her fellow inmates are strong, experienced warriors. Abbie Cornish, Jena Malone, Vanessa Hudgens, Jamie Chung, Carla Gugino, and Oscar Isaac also star.

The film was released in both conventional and IMAX theatres in the United States on March 25, 2011. The film received generally negative reviews and was a box office bomb, grossing just $89 million against its $82 million production budget.

Plot

A young woman named Babydoll is committed to a hospital for the mentally insane. This was initiated by her stepfather, in an attempt to gain everything in the will left by recently deceased mother after discovering she had left it all to her daughters. Prior to this, the stepfather had murdered the girls' mother and sexually abused them both. He bribes asylum orderly Blue Jones to forge psychiatrist Vera Gorski's signature to have Babydoll lobotomized. Babydoll takes note of four items she would need to escape.

Babydoll slips into a fantasy world in which she has newly arrived at a brothel owned by Blue, who in this world is a mobster, where she and the other patients are sex slaves. Babydoll befriends four other patients: Amber, Blondie, Rocket, and Rocket's sister and "star of the show", Sweet Pea. Dr. Gorski is the girls' dance instructor. Blue informs Babydoll her virginity will be sold to a client known as the High Roller, who is actually the doctor scheduled to perform her lobotomy. Gorski has Babydoll perform an erotic dance, during which Babydoll fantasizes she is in feudal Japan, meeting the Wise Man. The Wise Man presents Babydoll with weapons and tells her that she needs four items to escape: a map, fire, a knife and a key; other than the named items, there is also a fifth unrevealed item that only she can find, which would require "a deep sacrifice" and bring a "perfect victory". She fights three samurai giants, then finds herself back in the brothel having impressed Blue and other onlookers.

Babydoll convinces the four girls to join her preparations to escape, planning to use her dances as a distraction while the other girls obtain the necessary tools. During her dances, she fantasizes adventures that mirror the escape efforts. These adventures include infiltrating a bunker protected by World War I German soldiers to gain a map (mirrored by Sweet Pea copying a map of the brothel/institution from Blue's office), storming an Orc-infested castle to retrieve two fire-producing crystals (mirrored by Amber stealing a lighter from the mayor's pocket), and fighting robotic guards on board a train to disarm a bomb (mirrored by Sweet Pea stealing a kitchen knife from the Cook's belt). During the last fantasy, Rocket sacrifices herself to guarantee Sweet Pea's escape from the bomb's blast, paralleled by the Cook fatally stabbing Rocket as she tries to protect her sister.

Blue overhears Blondie relaying Babydoll's plan to Gorski. He locks Sweet Pea in a closet and confronts the other girls. He fatally shoots Amber and Blondie, and attempts to rape Babydoll, but she stabs him with the kitchen knife and steals his master key. Babydoll frees Sweet Pea and starts a fire to keep the orderlies occupied while they seek an exit. A throng of men blocks their way. Babydoll deduces that the fifth item she needs is actually her own sacrifice, and that this is actually Sweet Pea's story. Babydoll distracts the men long enough to allow Sweet Pea to slip away.

Back in the asylum, the surgeon has just performed Babydoll's lobotomy. Gorski notes that during her short stay, the girl stabbed an orderly, started a fire, and helped another girl escape the asylum. The surgeon asks Gorski why she authorized the procedure, and Gorski realizes that Blue has been forging her signature and summons the police, who apprehend Blue just as he attempts to rape Babydoll. As he is being arrested, Blue also incriminates the stepfather. Babydoll is shown smiling serenely.

Sweet Pea is stopped by police as she tries to board a bus, but the bus driver (the Wise Man) misleads the police and lets her board.

Cast

Production

Development

Sucker Punch is described by Snyder as "Alice in Wonderland with machine guns". The film first gained attention in March 2007. Snyder put the project aside to work on Watchmen first. The film was co-written with Steve Shibuya, who authored the original script on which the story is based. Snyder directed and produced with his wife and producing partner, Deborah Snyder, through their Cruel and Unusual Films banner. Wesley Coller served as executive producer.

Warner Bros. announced in early 2009 that they would distribute Sucker Punch due to the success of Snyder's previous film, Watchmen. "They've never said, 'Ahh, it could have been shorter', or, 'Too bad it's so R-ish.' And that's really cool. I'm challenging them again with Sucker Punch." In early interviews, Snyder stated that he would make Sucker Punch an R-rated film, but a later interview stated that he was aiming for it to be rated PG-13. In its theatrical release, the movie was ultimately rated PG-13. Snyder cut many crucial scenes before the film's release in order to satisfy the MPAA's censors, but claimed that the home media release of the film will be a director's cut and closer to his original vision.

When Snyder was in San Diego hosting a Blu-ray live screening of Watchmen for Comic-Con, he handed out T-shirts for Sucker Punch featuring the first art for the film. The art was designed by Alex Pardee of Snafu Comics, with title art work by Los Angeles graffiti artist Galo Canote. Pre-production began in June 2009 in Canada. Snyder had also added that he enjoyed the freedom of filming his own original script. Photographer Clay Enos was hired to take still pictures on set and to take portraits of the main actors.

Casting

Before casting started in March 2009, Snyder revealed his ideal cast for the feature film. He chose to go with an all-female cast in this film saying that "I already did the all-male cast with 300, so I'm doing the opposite end of the spectrum."

Snyder had tapped Amanda Seyfried first for the lead role, Babydoll. When asked if Seyfried was up for the role, Snyder said, "We'll see. We're trying to, so ... She's great. It would be great if it worked out". Snyder had also offered roles to Abbie Cornish, Evan Rachel Wood, Emma Stone, and Vanessa Hudgens. However, Seyfried turned it down due to a conflict in schedule with her HBO series Big Love. Browning agreed to replace Seyfried in the role. During the confirmation of her involvement, Hudgens, Wood, Cornish, and Stone were all still in talks. According to Brie Larson in a 2020 video on YouTube, she mentioned that she auditioned for Sucker Punch.

Wood dropped out of the project due to scheduling conflicts with her recurring role in HBO's True Blood and her stage production of Spider-Man: Turn Off the Dark. She was later replaced by Malone for the role of "Rocket". Chung was signed up to play "Amber"; Emma Stone had been offered the part but declined due schedule conflict with her film Easy A. Freida Pinto was also considered for the role of "Amber" before it went to Jamie Chung. Gugino, who was cast as "Madam Gorski", a psychiatrist in the asylum, previously worked with Snyder on Watchmen. Hamm was confirmed in late August 2009 to play "The High Roller". Isaac was also tapped at around the same time. Snyder confirmed that Glenn agreed to be involved in the project, portraying "The Wise Man".

Training
Prior to filming, the cast had twelve weeks of training and fight evaluations, beginning in June 2009 in Los Angeles and continuing through filming. Damon Caro, the stunt coordinator and fight choreographer from 300 and Watchmen, Snyder's previous films, was hired for the action design, stunt training and fight choreography for the movie. The other cast members started training without Hudgens while she was involved with other projects, including Beastly. Abbie Cornish said that the rest of the cast were training six hours a day, five days a week in martial arts, swords and empty hand choreography. Jena Malone has stated that her daily routine comprised four hours of warmups and mixed martial arts wushu training, then three hours of weight training, then firearms training and tactical positioning, and then pole-dancing lessons. Snyder said that when the girls are fighting, "[like] they're on their way to kill a baby dragon, they've killed all of these orc-like creatures and they're entering a door [and] it's this classic, real Navy SEAL style room clearing. They have machine guns but they're fighting mythic creatures, impossible creatures. The hand to hand stuff is all brutal, because Damon [Caro] did all the [fights] in Bourne and it has that vibe to it." Snyder remarks that in the girls' imaginations "they can do anything".

Production and design
Pre-production began in Los Angeles in June 2009 then moved to Vancouver in July. Principal photography began in September 2009 in Vancouver, and concluded in January 2010. With an $82 million budget, post-production began in September 2009 and was expected to last until January 2010 in Vancouver and Toronto. Originally, production would have started in June 2009, but it was postponed. Production concluded on January 22, 2010. Snyder confirmed that prior to the set production date, he already shot some fantasy sequences for Sucker Punch. Snyder said the film is a "stylized motion picture about action and sort of landscapes of the imagination and things of that nature". Snyder had also been decided on the film's title for some time, stating it is a pop-culture reference. "It's about hopefully what the movie feels like when you watch it, more than a specific 'Oh, it's a story of this person.' It's all stylized."

The film includes an imaginary brothel that the five girls enter in the alternate reality, where singing and dancing take place. The fantasy sequences include dragons, aliens, and a World War I battle. Snyder expressed his interest in the film's content:

On the other hand, though it's fetishistic and personal, I like to think that my fetishes aren't that obscure. Who doesn't want to see girls running down the trenches of World War One wreaking havoc? I'd always had an interest in those worlds – comic books, fantasy art, animated films. I'd like to see this, that's how I approach everything, and then keep pushing it from there.

Rick Carter served as production designer while the visual effects of the film were done by Animal Logic with 75 visual effects specialists, and the Moving Picture Company (MPC) who were awarded over 120 shots. Sucker Punch operates on three levels – a reality, then a sub-reality where the psych ward world shifts into a strange high-roller's brothel. The final level is made up of a dream world where more action sequences that are removed from time and space take place. Warner Bros. announced earlier that Sucker Punch would be released in 3D format. Snyder describes the conversion into 3D as a completely different process. However, it was later announced that the film would not be presented in 3D. Snyder filmed a "Maximum Movie Mode" interactive Blu-ray commentary for the film's home media release.

Snyder wanted to design the film as something with no limits, considering that he co-wrote the script from an original idea. He added that he wanted it to "be a cool story and not just like a video game where you're just loose and going nuts." Snyder also noted the influence of Asian iconography, particularly Japanese elements such as samurai, anime, and mecha.

Title
The title Sucker Punch is not explained in the film. Snyder has said that there are two meanings:

Andrew O'Hehir, writing in Salon, sees the film's title as its essential theme:

Snyder has stated one interpretation of the film is that it is a critique of geek culture's sexism and objectification of women.

Music and dance

Music plays an integral role in the film. "In the story, music is the thing that launches them into these fantasy worlds", Snyder explains. Composer Tyler Bates said that the songs "function as the subconscious mind of Baby Doll and her journey", and musical producer Marius de Vries considered it "an important task of the songs to signplace which particular world you are inhabiting at a particular moment". They used pre-existing songs for Sucker Punch, covering them in a way that would create suitable moods. Music thus becomes the backbone of the film and is used as it was in Moulin Rouge!, according to Snyder. Dance choreography was spearheaded by Paul Becker. Emily Browning did the vocals for the songs Sweet Dreams, Asleep and Where Is My Mind that are played during the movie. Carla Gugino had to take singing lessons for her scenes as a choreographer madam in the brothel. The brothel scenario has "sexy" songs, as Jamie Chung described, and dance fantasy scenes. Due to time constraints, Snyder was forced to cut most of the dance sequences for the theatrical release of the film, but there is one during the credits. He did mention that for the home media release of the film's "director's cut", the dance scenes will be re-inserted.

In September 2009, Chung reported that they had begun recording tracks for Sucker Punch. Oscar Isaac said the songs used in the film are not original, but are new arrangements of existing music.

Tyler Bates (who composed all of Snyder's previous live-action films) and Marius de Vries (who composed the score for the film Moulin Rouge!) co-wrote the film score. The official trailers contain samples from the songs "Prologue" by Immediate Music, "Crablouse" by Lords of Acid, "When the Levee Breaks" by Led Zeppelin, "Tomorrow Never Knows" by The Beatles, "And Your World Will Burn" by Cliff Lin, "Panic Switch" by the Silversun Pickups, and "Illusion of Love" (Fred Falke remix) by Uffie.

Sucker Punch: Original Motion Picture Soundtrack was released on March 22, 2011 by WaterTower Music. It contained nine tracks, all covers, remixes, and mash-ups (as the label website says, "wildly re-imagined versions of classic songs") of tracks by Alison Mosshart, Björk, Queen, and performances from stars Emily Browning, Carla Gugino, and Oscar Isaac. The album was praised by music and film critics, as were Browning's vocals.

Release

Marketing
Sucker Punch participated in the Comic-Con 2010 and showed the first footage of the film, featuring the songs "Prologue" by Immediate Music and "The Crablouse" by Lords of Acid. The trailer was released on July 27 on Apple Trailers. The second official trailer was released on November 3 and was attached to Due Date, Harry Potter and the Deathly Hallows – Part 1, and Black Swan. On February 15, Titan Books released the official Art of the Film book full of pictures, to mark the film's release in the following month.

The film received a PG-13 rating. To avoid an R rating, a scene that implied sex was cut. Browning said, "I had a very tame and mild love scene with John [sic] Hamm ... I think it's great for this young girl to actually take control of her own sexuality. Well, the MPAA doesn't like that. They don't think a girl should ever be in control of her own sexuality because they're from the Stone Age... they got Zack to edit the scene and make it look less like she's into it. And Zack said he edited it down to the point where it looked like he was taking advantage of her. That's the only way he could get a PG-13 [rating] and he said, 'I don't want to send that message.' So they cut the scene!"

In the United Kingdom, the film received a 12A certificate for "moderate violence, threat, language and sexual references". The film was passed with no additional cuts required. The extended cut was given a 12.

Box office
Sucker Punch grossed $19,058,199 in its first weekend, an opening that placed it second behind Diary of a Wimpy Kid: Rodrick Rules. It also opened in 23 markets that weekend, standing at sixth in the overseas box office with $6.5 million. The following weekend, it dropped to seventh place in North America with $6 million, but fared better overseas, where an expansion to 16 more countries led to a $11.5 million gross which topped the international ranking. Sucker Punch eventually grossed $36,392,502 domestically and $53,400,000 abroad, leading to a worldwide total of $89,792,502.

Home media
Sucker Punch was released on DVD and in a Blu-ray combo pack on June 28, 2011. The film reached #1 best-selling DVD for four weeks in a row, selling over a million copies in America on its premiere day. An R-rated extended cut was included on the Blu-ray release, which adds 18 minutes to the film. The bonus features include four animated shorts based on the four fantasy scenarios.

Unreleased director's cut
Snyder has stated that the extended cut of Sucker Punch isn't his desired version of the film, but complications over film rights make it uncertain as to whether or not his director's cut could ever be released.

Reception

Critical response
Review aggregate website Rotten Tomatoes reports that 22% of 218 critics have given Sucker Punch a positive review, with an average rating of 4.2/10. The site's critics consensus reads: "It's technically impressive and loaded with eye-catching images, but without characters or a plot to support them, all of Sucker Punchs visual thrills are for naught." Metacritic assigned the film a weighted average score of 33 out of 100, based on 29 critics, indicating "generally unfavorable reviews". Audiences polled by CinemaScore gave the film an average grade of "B−" on an A+ to F scale.

Although Snyder had claimed that he wanted the film to "be a cool story and not just like a video game where you're just loose and going nuts", some critics compared the film unfavorably to a video game in their reviews. Richard Roeper gave the film a D, saying that it "proves a movie can be loud, action-packed and filled with beautiful young women – and still bore you to tears." The Orlando Sentinel gave the movie one out of four stars calling it "an unerotic unthrilling erotic thriller in the video game mold". The A.V. Club'''s Nathan Rabin wrote, "with its quests to retrieve magical totems, clearly demarcated levels, and non-stop action, Snyder's clattering concoction sometimes feels less like a movie than an extended, elaborate trailer for its redundant videogame adaptation." Reviewing it for The Sydney Morning Herald, Giles Hardie called the film "incredibly ambitious", and explained that while "traditional depths of character development and motivation are sidelined, [...] this is intentional, allowing the audience to immerse in the layers of dreams and later piece together what actually happened".

British film critic Mark Kermode described the film as "the most boring, ploddingly put together, infantile, crass, adolescent, stupid, chauvinistic twaddle that I've sat through in a very, very long time." Filmmaker Quentin Tarantino named it one of the worst movies he had ever seen in 2011.

Legendary Pictures reportedly attributed the movie's failure to become a box office hit to movie audiences not accepting a female action hero.

Not all reviews were negative, however. Keith Uhlich of Time Out New York named Sucker Punch the tenth-best title of 2011: "This excessive digi-satire spits in the face of fanboys-'n'-their-franchises." Sonny Bunch hailed the movie as an "exciting, entertaining piece of work, one that subverts your expectations even as it plays to your presumptions." In a 2018 article for Oscilloscope Laboratories, Sheila O'Malley wrote favorably of Sucker Punch and described its similarities with the Depression-era musical Gold Diggers of 1933.

Depiction of womenSucker Punch also drew criticism for its depiction of women. Several critics described the film as misogynistic and others expressed concern over its treatment of sexual violence. Monika Bartyzel of Moviefone writes: "The women of Zack Snyder's Sucker Punch are not empowered. Though they are given vicious snarls, swords and guns, the leading ladies of Snyder's latest are nothing more than cinematic figures of enslavement given only the most minimal fight. Their rebellion is one of imaginative whimsy in a heavily misogynistic world that is barely questioned or truly challenged." Michael Phillips of The Chicago Tribune stated that "Zack Snyder must have known in preproduction that his greasy collection of near-rape fantasies and violent revenge scenarios disguised as a female-empowerment fairy tale wasn't going to satisfy anyone but himself."St. Petersburg Times critic Steve Persall found that the most offensive fact about the film was that it "suggests that all this objectification of women makes them stronger. It's supposed to be reassuring that men who beat, berate, molest and kill these women will get what's coming to them. Just wait, Snyder says, but in the meantime here's another femininity insult to keep you occupied." A.O. Scott of The New York Times described the film as a "fantasia of misogyny" that pretends to be a "feminist fable of empowerment" and found that the film's treatment of sexual violence was problematic and believes the target audience as a whole is in favour of it. Peter Debruge of Variety argued that the film is "misleadingly positioned as female empowerment despite clearly having been hatched as fantasy fodder for 13-year-old guys" and that the fact that the young women in the movie are "under constant threat of being raped or murdered" makes the film "highly inappropriate for young viewers."

However, Betsy Sharkey of The Los Angeles Times suggested that the film neither objectifies nor empowers women, and is instead a "wonderfully wild provocation – an imperfect, overlong, intemperate and utterly absorbing romp through the id that I wouldn't have missed for the world." In a retrospective article about the critical reception of Sucker Punch, James MacDowell questioned the alleged misogyny of the film, arguing that it does not in fact aim to offer female empowerment, but is instead "a deeply pessimistic analysis of female oppression", because it makes clear that, "just as men organize the dances, so do they control the terms of the fight scenes; in neither do the women have true agency, only an illusion of it."

Writing in a separate piece for The A.V. Club months after giving the film a "C−" grade, Nathan Rabin concluded, "Depending on whom you ask, Snyder set out to make either the ultimate sexist masturbatory fanboy fantasy or the ultimate critique of sexist masturbatory fanboy fantasies. He failed spectacularly on both counts, but in true Fiasco form, there's something fascinating and even strangely majestic about that failure."

Scott Mendelsohn of The Huffington Post called the film a "bitterly sad and angrily feminist mini-epic", and said that while it presents scenes of "matter-of-fact lechery from men towards women that is an accepted norm in our society, both then and now", it "earns kudos for daring to actually be about something relevant and interesting. It is actually very much about the sexualization of women in popular culture, rather than just using those tools to make pointless exploitation fare." Patrick Bromley of DVD Verdict posited that Sucker Punch uses the "prism of popular culture to say something about the roles that women find themselves forced into—and not just in the fantasies of geeks and fanboys". Bromley further judged that the film is "about fighting a losing battle. About using every tool at your disposal, be it sexuality or physical strength or wit or the ability to band together to fight a common enemy—the tool of Sisterhood—and about how that still isn't enough."

In retrospect, Snyder said: "I'm always shocked that it was so badly misunderstood. I always said that it was a commentary on sexism and geek culture. Someone would ask me, 'Why did you film the girls this way?' And I'd say, 'Well you did!' Sucker Punch is a fuck you to a lot of people who will watch it." Double Toasted criticized this statement in a retrospective review, claiming the film had not aged well in recent years.

Accolades
Though the film's content was derided, the film received some recognition for the visual effects of the fantasy sequences. Sucker Punch'' received a nomination at the 2011 Scream Awards for Best F/X, and its stunt work was nominated for a Taurus Award. The film was also pre-nominated for the Academy Award for Best Visual Effects.

References

External links

 
 
 
 
 

2011 films
2011 action films
2010s fantasy action films
American fantasy action films
2010s English-language films
The Stone Quarry films
Films directed by Zack Snyder
Films produced by Deborah Snyder
Films produced by Zack Snyder
Films scored by Tyler Bates
Films scored by Marius de Vries
Films set in psychiatric hospitals
Films set in the 1960s
Films set in Vermont
Films shot in Toronto
Films shot in Vancouver
Films with screenplays by Zack Snyder
Girls with guns films
IMAX films
Legendary Pictures films
Magic realism films
Steampunk films
2010s American films